Bathymunida frontis is a species of squat lobster in the family Munididae. The specific epithet is derived from the Latin frontis, meaning "fore part", in reference to the concave appearance of the back of the rostrum.

References

Squat lobsters
Crustaceans described in 1996